The Cusrow Wadia Institute of Technology is a polytechnical educational center in Pune, India.  It was founded in 1938 by the Modern Education Society of Pune. 

The Modern Education Society was founded in 1932 in Pune by Prin. V. K. Joag, an educationalist, and Sir Cusrow Wadia, an industrialist.  In 1938, the Society opened the institute with a department of applied electricity. Today, the Institute provides a wide variety of programs.

Sir Wadia had a strong belief in the value of electronics to Indian industry. He made many donations to the Institute after its founding. He would also frequently invite dignitaries to speak to students there. As a leader of the Society, Joag worked to enlarge and improve the Institute.

References

 

Engineering colleges in Pune